Lower Mill is a hamlet in the parish of Veryan, Cornwall, England, UK.

References

Hamlets in Cornwall